USS Sunflower is a name used more than once by the United States Navy:

 , a gunboat during the American Civil War.
 , a vessel for the United States Lighthouse Service.

United States Navy ship names